Shaun Rodney Gorman (born 28 April 1965) is an English former first-class cricketer.

Gorman was born in Middlesbrough in April 1965. He was educated in York at St Peter's School, before going up to Emmanuel College, Cambridge. While studying at Cambridge, he played first-class cricket for Cambridge University Cricket Club from 1985 to 1987, making 22 appearances. He scored 370 runs in his 22 matches at an average of 14.23, with a highest score of 43 not out. He struggled as an off break bowler against first-class county opposition, bowling 166 overs in which he took 5 wickets.

References

External links

1965 births
Living people
Cricketers from Middlesbrough
People educated at St Peter's School, York
Alumni of Emmanuel College, Cambridge
English cricketers
Cambridge University cricketers